Orange Township is one of the seventeen townships of Hancock County, Ohio, United States. As of the 2010 census, the population was 1,348, of whom 1,175 lived in the unincorporated portions of the township.

Geography
Located in the southwestern corner of the county, it borders the following townships:
Union Township - north
Eagle Township - northeast corner
Van Buren Township - east
Washington Township, Hardin County - southeast corner
Liberty Township, Hardin County - south
Jackson Township, Allen County - southwest corner
Richland Township, Allen County - west

Part of the village of Bluffton is located in northwestern Orange Township.

Name and history
It is one of six Orange Townships statewide.

Orange Township was organized in 1836.

Government
The township is governed by a three-member board of trustees, who are elected in November of odd-numbered years to a four-year term beginning on the following January 1. Two are elected in the year after the presidential election and one is elected in the year before it. There is also an elected township fiscal officer, who serves a four-year term beginning on April 1 of the year after the election, which is held in November of the year before the presidential election. Vacancies in the fiscal officership or on the board of trustees are filled by the remaining trustees.

References

External links

Townships in Hancock County, Ohio
Townships in Ohio